The 2022–23 Scottish Championship (known as cinch Championship for sponsorship reasons) is the tenth season of the Scottish Championship, the second tier of Scottish football.

Ten teams contest the league: Arbroath, Ayr United, Cove Rangers, Dundee, Greenock Morton, Hamilton Academical, Inverness Caledonian Thistle, Partick Thistle, Queen's Park and Raith Rovers.

Teams
The following teams changed division after the 2021–22 season.

To Championship
Promoted from League One
 Cove Rangers
 Queen's Park

Relegated from the Premiership
 Dundee

From Championship
Relegated to League One
 Dunfermline Athletic
 Queen of the South

Promoted to the Premiership
 Kilmarnock

Stadia and locations

Personnel and kits

Managerial changes

League summary

League table

Results 
Teams play each other four times, twice in the first half of the season (home and away) and twice in the second half of the season (home and away), making a total of 180 games, with each team playing 36.

First half of season (Matches 1–18)

Second half of season (Matches 19–36)

Season statistics

Scoring

Top scorers

Awards

References

External links
Official website

Scottish Championship seasons
2
2
Scotland
Current association football seasons